
The Electoral district of Cumberland Boroughs, also known as the United towns of Windsor, Richmond, Liverpool and Campbelltown, was an electorate of the New South Wales Legislative Council at a time when two thirds (24 members) were elected, one sixth (six members) were official members, that is they held a government office and the balance (six members) were appointed by the Governor.

The district was created by the Electoral Act 1843, returning one member. and consisted of the Cumberland County towns, or boroughs, of Richmond, Windsor, Liverpool and Campbelltown, but not the surrounding rural areas, which were in the district of County of Cumberland. The district was unchanged when the Legislative Council was expanded in 1851.

In 1856 the unicameral Legislative Council was abolished and replaced with an elected Legislative Assembly and an appointed Legislative Council. The district was represented by the single member Legislative Assembly electorate of Cumberland Boroughs and William Bowman was re-elected.

Members for Cumberland Boroughs

Election results

1843

1848

1851

1853
John Holden resigned in March 1853.

See also
Members of the New South Wales Legislative Council, 1843–1851 and 1851-1856

External links

References

Former electoral districts of New South Wales Legislative Council
1843 establishments in Australia
1856 disestablishments in Australia